"Fighting Fire with Fire" is a song recorded by American country music artist Davis Daniel.  It was released in January 1992 as the third single and title track from the album Fighting Fire with Fire.  The song reached #27 on the Billboard Hot Country Singles & Tracks chart.  The song was written by Michael White and Conley White.

Chart performance

References

1992 singles
1991 songs
Davis Daniel songs
Song recordings produced by Ron Haffkine
Songs written by Michael White (singer)
Mercury Records singles